Mehrabad-e Tudehrud (also Romanized as Mehrābād-e Tūdehrūd and Mehrābād-e Tovahrūd) is a village in Kakavand-e Sharqi Rural District, Kakavand District, Delfan County, Lorestan Province, Iran. At the 2006 census, its population was 113, in 26 families.

References 

Towns and villages in Delfan County